Kabayama is a Japanese surname. Notable people with the surname include:

, Japanese samurai, businessman and privy counselor
, Japanese samurai
Matthew Kabayama (born 1965), Canadian-born Japanese ice hockey player
, Japanese government official and businessman
, Japanese governor of Taiwan

Fictional characters
, a character in the anime series Yu-Gi-Oh! GX

Japanese-language surnames